The 1958 Florida Gators football team represented the University of Florida during the 1958 NCAA University Division football season. The season was the ninth of ten for Bob Woodruff as the head coach of the Florida Gators football team. Woodruff's 1958 Florida Gators finished with an overall record of 6–4–1 and a Southeastern Conference (SEC) record of 2–3–1, placing eighth in the twelve-member SEC.

Before the season
The prospects for the 1958 season were devastated by Bernie Parrish deciding to play baseball with the Cincinnati Reds. The Gators were led by quarterback Jimmy Dunn, defensive back Don Fleming, halfback and punter Bobby Joe Green and All-American tackle Vel Heckman.

Schedule

Roster
QB Jimmy Dunn, Sr.

Game summaries

Tulane
The season opened with a 34–14 conference wins over the Tulane Green Wave

Mississippi State
The first disappointment of the season came in the second week, when the Gators lost 7–14 to the eleventh-ranked Mississippi State Bulldogs.

UCLA
In the third week of play, Florida had an intersectional victory over the UCLA Bruins 21–14 on the road in Los Angeles, California.

Vanderbilt
Florida tied Vanderbilt 6–6.

LSU

Source:

The Gators lost to the eventual consensus national champion LSU Tigers at the latter's homecoming. The Tigers snapped a three-game losing streak to the Gators with a 10–7 defensive struggle that came down to the last three minutes of play. The game featured one of the strongest rushing teams in the nation against one of the league's best run defenses. The Tigers, led by halfbacks Billy Cannon and Johnny Robinson, averaged 220 yards rushing per game. The Gators had held their previous opponents to an average of 65 yards rushing per game. LSU was favored by two touchdowns. Bill Kastelz, the sports editor of the Jacksonville Times-Union, wrote that Heckman's play reached All-American levels against No. 3-ranked LSU on October 25, 1958.

Auburn
In a 5–6 loss to fourth-ranked Auburn, an injury to a Florida tackles led Woodruff to employ the unorthodox strategy of shifting Heckman between right and left tackle. Bill Kastelz, the sports editor of the Jacksonville Times-Union, wrote: "Big, fast and tough, he outshone all of Auburn's great linemen." According to Auburn coach Shug Jordan, "There should be a law to prevent things like that. We were supposed to run plays where Heckman wasn't, and he's there now."

Coach Bob Woodruff's Gators and coach Shug Jordan's Tigers played nine games against each other between 1951 and 1959, only three of which were decided by more than ten points. However, none was closer than the game between the unranked Gators and the defending national champions and fourth-ranked Tigers in 1958, a game in which neither team scored more than six points. Late in the fourth quarter, with the Tigers leading 6–3 on the strength of a single touchdown and a missed extra point, the stingy Gators defense pinned the Tigers offense behind their own three-yard-line. Rather than risk a turnover, Jordan ordered Tigers quarterback Johnny Kern to kneel in their own end zone, intentionally scoring a safety for the Gators, but earning a free punt for the Tigers. The Tigers kicked it away, and their defense held on to win 6–5.

Georgia
The Gators beat the rival Georgia Bulldogs 7–6.

Arkansas State
Florida beat Arkansas State 51–7.

Florida State

    
    
    
    

The Gators had a 21–7, first-time victory over the new in-state rival Florida State Seminoles

Miami
The season included a 12–9 upset of the Miami Hurricanes.

Postseason
The Gators capped the year with a season-ending 3–7 loss to the eleventh-ranked Ole Miss Rebels in a defensive struggle in the December 1958 Gator Bowl in Jacksonville, Florida.

References

Additional sources
 

Florida
Florida Gators football seasons
Florida Gators football